"Ring the Alarm" is the debut single by American hip hop group Fu-Schnickens, released in November 1991. It is from the group's 1992 debut album F.U. Don't Take It Personal. The song reached No. 6 on the US Billboard Hot Rap Songs chart.

Track listing
12", 33 RPM, CD, vinyl
"Ring the Alarm" (LP Version) - 3:50
"Ring the Alarm" (Steely & Clevie Remix) - 3:55
"Ring the Alarm" (Steely & Clevie Extended Mix) - 4:54
"Ring the Alarm" (LP Instrumental) - 3:50

Personnel
Information taken from Discogs.
additional production – Steely & Clevie
direction – Philip Pabon
engineering – Anthony Saunders
guitar – Danny Browne
management – Philip Pabon
mastering – Tom Coyne
mix engineering – Chris Trevett
photography – Michael Benabib
production – Lyvio G.
remixing – Steely & Clevie
writing – Lyvio G., J. Jones, L. Maturine, R. Roachford

Chart performance

References

1991 songs
1991 debut singles
Fu-Schnickens songs
Jive Records singles